is a former Japanese football player. She played for Japan national team.

Club career
Sano was born on February 5, 1983. She played for Tasaki Perule FC.

National team career
On March 19, 2003, when Sano was 20 years old, she debuted for Japan national team against Thailand.

National team statistics

References

1983 births
Living people
Japanese women's footballers
Japan women's international footballers
Nadeshiko League players
Tasaki Perule FC players
Women's association football midfielders